Sports Legends Museum at Camden Yards was a non-profit sports museum in Baltimore, Maryland, United States, owned and operated by the Babe Ruth Birthplace & Museum. It opened on May 14, 2005, with Julia Ruth Stevens, the daughter of celebrated baseball player Babe Ruth, in attendance. After ten years of operation the museum closed abruptly on October 12, 2015 after failing to reach an agreement with the Maryland Stadium Authority for the continued use of Camden Station. The  museum was adjacent to the main gate of Oriole Park at Camden Yards and had artifacts and interactive exhibits profiling Maryland’s sports history. Exhibits included such area teams as the Baltimore Orioles, Baltimore Ravens, Baltimore Colts, Maryland Terrapins, Baltimore Elite Giants, Baltimore Black Sox, and the Baltimore Blast.

The museum was housed in the former Camden Station, originally constructed in 1857 by the Baltimore and Ohio Railroad (B&O) as its main passenger station in Baltimore. After being vacant since the 1980s, the depot's exterior was restored in the 1990s as part of the development of the Camden Yards Sports Complex. Later interior renovations and remodeling were made to accommodate the building's adaptive reuse as a sports museum. Geppi's Entertainment Museum, which opened in September 2006, was located on the upper level of the building, directly above where Sports Legends at Camden Yards was, until 2018. The nearby Babe Ruth Birthplace & Museum remains in existence as a separate museum on Emory Street, two and a half blocks from Camden Station.

A replica of the Vince Lombardi Trophy from Super Bowl V is part of the museum's collection. The original trophy from the Colts' 1971 Super Bowl victory was taken by former owner Carroll Rosenbloom after he traded the Colts for the Los Angeles Rams in 1972. A replica trophy was later made for the Colts, but in the Midnight Move of 1984, the team was not allowed to keep the trophy.  That trophy stayed in the city of Baltimore's possession, and was placed in the Sports Legends Museum.

See also
Baltimore Orioles Hall of Fame

References

External links
 Sports Legends Museum at Camden Yards website
 Sports Legends Museum on Google Street View

Museums in Baltimore
Museums established in 2005
Sports museums in Maryland
2005 establishments in Maryland
Downtown Baltimore
Clock towers in Maryland
Defunct museums in Maryland
Museums disestablished in 2015
2015 disestablishments in Maryland